= Meloukome =

Town of ancient Lydia

Coordinates: 38°34′46″N 28°11′28″E

Meloukome was a town of ancient Lydia, inhabited during Roman times.

Its site is located near Çapaklı in Asiatic Turkey.
